Chandrabhaga may refer to:

Rivers
 Chenab River in Punjab, India
 Bhima River near Pandharpur, Maharashtra, India
 Chandrabhaga River (Purna River) in Maharashtra, India

Other uses
 Chandrabhaga Dam (Nagpur), Maharashtra, India
 Chandrabhaga Dam (Amravati), Maharashtra, India
 Chandrabhaga beach in Odisha, India
 Chandrabhaga, mythological character in Indian epic Ramayana, wife of Kushadhwaja
 Bekasi, a city in West Java, Indonesia
 Bekasi Regency, a regency in West Java, Indonesia